Lake Forest Graduate School of Management is a private non-profit business school in Lake Forest, Illinois. It opened in 1946 as a response to the need for WWII veterans to translate their experience into practical business skills and foundational business knowledge. In 2004, the institution moved its campus to its present location near the Tri-State Tollway. As of 2022, its graduate programs include a Leadership MBA, Leadership Foundations Graduate Certificate and open-enrollment, non-credit baring Executive Education courses. The campus of Lake Forest Graduate School of Management is also associated with The Lake Forest Center for Leadership, which offers Leadership Development consultation and customized programming to be held within external organizations.

History
Lake Forest Graduate School of Management was created to respond to a business need in the Lake Forest, Illinois area as a shortage of management talent left local industry in need of leadership.

To address the issue, three companies, Abbott Laboratories, Fansteel Metallurgical Corporation, and Johns-Manville Products Corporation joined with Lake Forest College to form the Lake Forest College Industrial Management Institute (IMI) in 1946. IMI provided management training for returning veterans to help them transition into business.

Since then LFGSM amicably separated from Lake Forest College, changed its name to Lake Forest Graduate School of Management, and established itself as a leading provider of both degree and non-degree business management education in the Chicago metropolitan area. LFGSM operates as an independent, private, not-for-profit organization.

LFGSM is accredited by the Higher Learning Commission and authorized to grant master's degrees by the Illinois Board of Higher Education.

References

External links
 Official website

1946 establishments in Illinois
Business schools in Illinois
Education in Lake County, Illinois
Educational institutions established in 1946
Lake Forest, Illinois
Private universities and colleges in Illinois
Graduate schools in the United States